The Lovett Tower (formerly known as the MLC Building) is a 93-metre-tall building (305 ft) located in the Woden Town Centre, a commercial district in Canberra.

History
Its construction was completed in 1973 by Civil & Civic, and it became the tallest building in Canberra. This title was replaced by the "High Society" development in Belconnen which was completed in 2020.

Shortly after its opening, in 1974, there was an incident where a gunman of indigenous background held four public servants part of the Department of Aboriginal Affairs at gunpoint, as a result armed guards were posted in the lobby for the next few months.

It became apparent during construction that the tower formed a kind of wind tunnel with the plaza below, and in 1975 the NCDC proposed building a clock tower to combat the problem while simultaneously telling the time. This project never progressed passed wind tunnel tests.

In 1984 the tower operators were fined $852 for breaches of the 1962 Companies Ordinance. Later that year it was found that the tower had major flaws in its fire evacuation procedure after a false alarm. At the time the building had no fire suppression systems, no visible or audible alarms, or any way of detecting or alerting fires. These safety features were added to the building shortly after, however it was also discovered that ACT Fire and Rescue was unable to properly respond to high rise fires, owning no extendable ladders.

In 1994 the building was bought by E.C. Managed Investments Group and then sold on to BZW Investment Management Group for A$47.5 million. In 2006 Lovett Tower was then purchased by Cromwell Property Group for A$73 million.
In 2020 the building was bought from Cromwell Property Group by Brite Developments Pty Limited. In 2022, Lovett Tower was purchased by Hunter Investment Corporation; also owner of the Hunter Economic Zone - Australia’s largest Industrial Estate and Business Park at 3,200 hectares, and one of the largest business estates in the Asia Pacific region. 

The Lovett Tower is a landmark commercial office, refurbished in 1999 and in 2007, and can be seen towering over the city far away from Canberra. It was formerly known as the MLC Tower but was renamed in 2000 by the Aboriginal and Torres Strait Islander Commission to honour the Lovett family.

Features
The Lovett Tower is the 3rd tallest structure in Canberra (behind Black Mountain Tower and the flagpole of Parliament House) but is the tallest building because it has the most storeys - 26 storeys high including a basement level (though it is merely the 258th tallest building in Australia), and it also has the height of 93 metres (305 ft).

The Tower is currently occupied by the Department of Veterans' Affairs, the Department of the Environment and the Department of the Prime Minister and Cabinet. However, the tower faces problems, as the building faces vacancy by 2016, as well as the departments occupying the building are cutting jobs in the hundreds. As such there is no public access to the building. On the ground floor however, are shopfronts, housing a credit union (on the eastern side) and a coffee shop (on the western side). there is restricted access to the 13th floor, including no 13th floor button in most of the lifts, as the floor houses the building plant. The tower has been considered to be reinvented as an aged-care facility after the departments currently occupying the tower move elsewhere.

Accommodation of the building consists of a single level basement, ground floor foyer, two ground floor tenancies, while the rest of the building mainly consists of office space. A mezzanine level is also found in the building. Upper levels of the building feature a central service core which accommodates female and male amenities, tea rooms, and multiple lifts and lift lobbies. The Woden Town Centre is notorious for the wind tunnel caused by the Lovett Tower.

Gallery

See also

List of tallest buildings in Canberra

References

External links
Image of the Lovett Tower and more information

Modernist architecture
Office buildings in Canberra
Skyscrapers in Canberra
Skyscraper office buildings in Australia
Office buildings completed in 1973